The Northern State Parkway (also known as the Northern Parkway or Northern State) is a  limited-access state parkway on Long Island in the U.S. state of New York. The western terminus is at the Queens–Nassau County line, where the parkway continues westward into New York City as the Grand Central Parkway. The eastern terminus is at New York State Route 347 (NY 347) and NY 454 in Hauppauge. The parkway is designated New York State Route 908G (NY 908G), an unsigned reference route. As its name implies, the parkway services communities along the northern half of the island.

In western Nassau County the parkway sports six lanes, three eastbound and three westbound, narrowing to four lanes total in central Nassau at the Wantagh Parkway (exit 33) and through its  or so in western Suffolk County, where it ends. It was constructed in stages throughout the 1930s and again post-World War II in the late 1940s/early 1950s until it reached its current terminus in Hauppauge in 1965. The Northern State Parkway is an eastern extension of the Grand Central Parkway. It was part of master planner Robert Moses' extensive road-building campaign and was built as a sister road to the Southern State Parkway. In recent years its design has quickly become dated due to an increase in commuter traffic using the roadway, and numerous improvements have been made (including the widening from four to six lanes in Central Nassau west to the Nassau-Queens line where it becomes the Grand Central) or are still on paper.

Route description
Like its siblings in the State Parkway system on Long Island, the Hudson Valley, and in New York City, commercial truck traffic is banned from the parkway due to low overpasses. The Long Island Expressway (designated Interstate 495, abbreviated LIE) was built later on by Moses to handle truck traffic traveling between New York City and Long Island's famed East End. The LIE runs directly alongside the Northern State in some parts of Nassau County.

Lake Success to Woodbury 
The Northern State Parkway begins at the Queens–Nassau county line in front of the Towers Country Club in Little Neck. After crossing the county line, the Northern State proceeds east through Lake Success as a six lane parkway, passing the northern end of the campus of Long Island Jewish Medical Center. A short distance east of the medical center, the parkway crosses under Lakeville Road and enters exit 25, which connects to Lakeville Road via Marcus Avenue. The parkway proceeds northeast through Lake Success, entering exit 26 which serves New Hyde Park Road. At this junction, the parkway remains in close distance of the Long Island Expressway (I-495). The parkway winds northeast through North Hills, approaching the eastbound lanes of the Long Island Expressway, but entering exit 27, which connects to Shelter Rock Road (County Route 8; CR 8).

The Northern State and the Long Island Expressway begin paralleling each other in both directions, passing north of Searingtown. Just east of exit 36 on the expressway, the Northern State breaks away to the east for a short distance through Albertson, entering exit 28, which connects to Willis Avenue. The six-lane parkway continues eastward through Albertson, crossing under a railroad line and entering exit 29, which connects to Roslyn Road. The Northern State then enters Old Westbury, passing a large set of baseball fields. Now paralleling Glen Cove Road, the Northern State proceeds south into exit 30, I.U. Willets Road. A short distance to the south, the parkway enters Wheatley Hills Golf Club and into Carle Place.

Through Carle Place, the Northern State enters exit 31, which connects to NY 25, crossing under NY 25B (Hillside Avenue). Bending east, the parkway crosses over NY 25 (Jericho Turnpike), entering exit 31A, which serves the northern terminus of the Meadowbrook State Parkway in Westbury. After the interchange, the parkway proceeds northeast, passing under Carle Road in Westbury, entering The Hedges section, where exit 32, serving Post Road, interchanges. The Northern State then crosses through Birchwood Knolls and West Jericho as a six-lane parkway, where it enters exit 33, the northern terminus of the Wantagh State Parkway. After crossing under the southbound lane access ramp, the Northern State crosses under a flyover from the Wantagh northbound, then entering exit 34 in the town of Oyster Bay, which serves Brush Hollow Road.

Continuing east through Jericho Gardens, the Northern State Parkway proceeds northeast as a four-lane roadway, passing north of Cantiauge Park as it enters West Birchwood. In West Birchwood, the Northern State bends northeast, beginning a new parallel with the Long Island Expressway. Like at exit 27, approaching the expressway, the Northern State enters interchange 35, which serves the concurrency of NY 106 and NY 107 (North Broadway). After the cloverleaf interchange, the parkway enters East Birchwood on a parallel of the Long Island Expressway, which connects to the Northern State via exit 42. Like the previous parallel, the Northern State forks east away from the expressway, crossing over a one-track railroad line through Birchwood. A short distance after, the parkway enters exit 36, a cloverleaf interchange with South Oyster Bay Road (CR 9) before entering Woodbury.

Woodbury to Commack 
In Woodbury, the Northern State Parkway continues east, crossing under Woodbury Road before entering a partial cloverleaf interchange with NY 135 (the Seaford–Oyster Bay Expressway). After NY 135, the parkway bends northeast, entering exit 37, which connects to Manetto Hill Road. A short distance after, the parkway enters another interchange with the Long Island Expressway (exit 37A) and an interchange with Sunnyside Boulevard (exit 38). Here, the route enters Trail View State Park before becoming a divided four-lane parkway through dense woods. The parkway makes a gradual bend to the east, then southeast, crossing the county line into Suffolk County just west of exit 39. Now in the town of Huntington, the Northern State enters exit 39, which serves Round Swamp Road.

After exit 39, the Northern State Parkway proceeds eastward as a four-lane freeway, crossing through West Hills County Park, where it winds through dense woods east and southeast through Huntington. Passing north of a cemetery, the parkway enters exit 40, which was formerly a cloverleaf interchange with NY 110 (Walt Whitman Road). After exit 40, the Northern State proceeds northeast, passing south of Whitman Park before bending east once again near Old Country Road. The four-lane parkway becomes divided once again, crossing northeast through Huntington into exit 41, a diamond interchange with Wolf Hill Road. The parkway soon enters the Caledonia section of town, bending eastward under Dix Hills Road as it enters the Arista section of town. The parkway crosses back into Caledonia, entering a partial cloverleaf interchange with Deer Park Road (NY 231 and CR 35). This interchange serves as the northern terminus of NY 231.

After Deer Park Road, the Northern State Parkway bends northeast once again, leaving the Caledonia area before bending southeast as a four-lane parkway. A short distance later, the route enters the Vanderbilt section of Huntington, paralleling north of CR 67 (Vanderbilt Parkway). In Vanderbilt, the parkway enters exit 43, a junction with CR 4 (Commack Road). Immediately after crossing over Commack Road, the large cloverleaf interchange that is Exits 44 and 45 comes in. Exit 44 serves the Sagtikos State Parkway and exit 45 serves the Sunken Meadow State Parkway, which share the same right-of-way. Now in the town of Smithtown, the Northern State enters the hamlet of Commack. Through Commack, the parkway becomes a divided four-lane roadway once again, entering exit 46 eastbound, which connects to New Highway via a service road.

After exit 46, the Northern State Parkway bends northeast, crossing through Mayfair and east of Hoyt Farm Park. The parkway soon crosses under New Highway in Commack, before entering a large interchange with NY 347 and NY 454 (Veterans Highway). This unnumbered interchange serves as the eastern terminus of the Northern State Parkway, whose northbound lanes merge into NY 347/NY 454 east.

History

Design

Wheatley Hills opposition 
Designs for the Long Island Parkway system were first brought up in 1925 by Robert Moses, the chairman of the Long Island State Park Commission (LISPC). This new parkway, designated as the "North Parkway", was a scenic roadway through Wheatley Hills, which was congested during the holiday seasons. Almost immediately, several wealthy residents of the neighborhood wanted the parkway realigned out of their neighborhood. The residents suggested that the North Parkway would damage home values through the Wheatley Hills area, a more centered parkway, designated the "Middle Parkway" would be better to develop, since most of the right-of-way would be along "wasted lands". The new parkway would soon reach the North Shore and Smithtown and would eventually improve the land along it.

Although they opposed the project, the committee developed by Wheatley Hills admitted that local property owners should ignore the case for the good of the general public. On March 6, 1925, the State of New York approved that the land for parks and parkways would not require the consent of the State Land Board, which would help Moses and the commission get land and start clearing the opposition of Wheatley Hills. On May 8, the LISPC held a public announcement of the system for parkways through Long Island, including a Northern State Parkway, connecting from Nassau Boulevard, and the Southern State Parkway, a new parkway from Central Avenue in Valley Stream. Both roads would have  right-of-way. The decision to expand the system was brought up by Governor Alfred E. Smith; the roads coming out of Queens are not capable of handling traffic from New York City.

The right-of-way would be bought by Nassau County authorities and the state disapproved the "Middle Parkway" proposal that would bypass Wheatley Hills. The middle alignment would be much more expensive and cross through several larger settlements through the county. Grade crossings could not be eliminated either in design of the new parkway and in general the proposed alignment was not feasible. The route preferred would parallel the former Long Island Motor Parkway through western Nassau County, which turned south near East Williston. The parkway would start paralleling again in Suffolk County as the route approached Lake Ronkonkoma.

However, the problems with Wheatley Hills persisted into May 1925, with the Regional Plan of New York getting involved in the debates. Smith and the LISPC toured the right-of-way to inspect the new alignment through Wheatley Hills along with an estate in East Islip that would affect the Northern State. The case had already been brought to courts to prevent the LISPC from taking the estate. Smith stated that the opponents of the new highway should prove that they have a serious argument. While Wheatley Hills opposed the project, it was admitted that they had offered to give land for use.  An editorial written in the New York Times stated that the circular route that the Northern State Parkway would bring would be stronger in handling traffic than the Middle Island Parkway.

In June 1925, Smith wrote a letter that was sent to Henry Earle, a resident of Wheatley Hills that he disagreed with. Smith responded to the letter and submitted it to the New York Times that detailed that he was happy to hear that some of the objectors in the region were beginning to lighten their view on the Northern State Parkway. Smith outlined that he supported the designs made by the LISPC and engineers. Smith mentioned he did not know who recently stated that the Wheatley Hills residents were going to be taught a "lesson" by the state and mentioned that no one had done so. Smith continued to show his support for the looped parkway system developed for Long Island and that having only one parkway (the Middle Island Parkway) would not be advantageous towards the goal. Earle mentioned in his letter than one cannot see the Atlantic Ocean and the Long Island Sound could not be seen from the proposed alignment and Smith responded that the Manetto Hills would go to High Hill, where magnificent views of the water could be seen.

Earle also argued the fact that the new parkway would destroy property values through the Wheatley Hills region. Evidence was supportive to Smith that the project would, in fact, raise property values through the region. Smith also took a case with the parkway crossing through 'uninteresting farmland" that would be destroyed. If the land does not exist according to Earle, Smith question what there was that would be destroyed. The final argument made was about the idea of Smith being selfish in the design of the parkway, which was rebuffed by claiming that the new parkway had help from many residents through Nassau County and that the number of people opposing were blowing it out of proportion. Smith completed the letter that he would forward the info to the LISPC that some residents were ready to cooperate.

Political opposition 
In August 1928, Smith, now running for President of the United States, attacked Republican Party leaders in the New York State Legislature for being "ignorant" and the obstructions of "every single park and parkway project on Long Island since 1924". Senator Charles Hewitt and Assemblyman Eberly Hutchinson both the financial chairs for their congressional departments, would not allow $50,000 (1928 USD) for surveys of the Northern State Parkway, at the total of $15,000, and for purchase of the right-of-way, which would cost $35,000. Smith argued that by withholding the $50,000, the state would lose valuable options of land for the roadway already acquired and ones proposed to be acquired. Smith instead hoped that locals would help pay for the surveys, similar to August Heckscher saving Deer Range State Park and that people would come forward.

Smith, although running for his campaign, would refuse to leave without beginning the skeleton of a new park and parkway system for Long Island and make sure the land needed would be in property of the state. Smith continued ripping the politicians and that they were on the side of those in Wheatley Hills and pledged to keep the parkway out of their neighborhood. However, Smith argued that the sentiment had changed in Wheatley Hills and that most of the residents were in support of the project. However, Hewitt and Hutchinson refused to permit the money because they would not touch any money until the Southern State Parkway was completed. Smith denied that agreement ever occurred. The money that was supposed to be use was from unappropriated state land in New York City. The money for purchasing land would go to those who agreed with the LISPC on prices or those who could not afford to give away the land.

Smith started arguing that Hutchison had approved to make the $50,000 expenditure, but wanted to talk to Hewitt first in July 1928. Hewitt also went and stated that the entire parkway would cost $50 million (1928 USD) to be constructed. Smith rebuffed that saying the parkway would be spread out over a period of a minimum of six years from the beginning of construction. The first piece would only be $5 million spent. Smith called the opposition reasons by Hutchinson and Hewitt as "absurd", though Smith admitted he said no funds for construction would be asked on until completion of the Southern State and the causeway to Jones Beach State Park. Smith said that they would have asked for the money this year if the legislature had not cut money that made it harder to get construction to Wantagh.

The next day, Hewitt and Hutchinson responded to the attacks of Smith, calling them "unqualified falsehoods" on their opposition to the parkway. Both politicians accused Smith of using this to divert attention from his struggling campaign against Herbert Hoover. Both Hewitt and Hutchinson determined that they refuse to meet ground with Smith, and that they would not make effort to contact Smith. Hutchinson accused Smith of only having one sentence that was true in his rant. Hutchinson also denied that he and Hewitt were obstructors in the park program for Long Island. Hewitt responded that the $50 million statement was untrue and both stated that Smith was trying to rush them into supporting the money.

Continued arguments 
Meanwhile, Robert Moses continued hawking the design of the Long Island parkway system and the benefits that these new parkways would bring about for residents. The Northern State Parkway, which would run  from Nassau Boulevard to the Sagtikos Manor Parkway in Dix Hills, had most of its land obtained by August 26, 1928, and by the time, only gaps in the right-of-way acquisition had existed in Westbury and in Jericho.

In March 1929, it was reported by the LISPC that more than 60% of the right-of-way needed for the Northern State Parkway and its spur parkway to the Southern State were acquired. By that point, the opposition for the new parkway remained only in Wheatley Hills and the committee formed in 1925 to get the parkway moved out of Wheatley Hills was still affecting the process of acquiring the needed land. The Northern State Parkway would choose the best route without any prejudices. Moses also told the supervisor of the town of Oyster Bay that Wheatley Hills estates were assessed to cost $1,000 per acre (1929 USD) and land near Hempstead were doubled that over Weatley Hills. The supervisor told the New York Times that they assessments were "grossly unfair" and "ridiculously low" compared to the estates within the same town, who were supporting giving land to the state.

Major William Kennedy, talked to the New York Times in late March 1929 about the opposition in Wheatley Hills to the Northern State Parkway project. Kennedy recently toured the route of the entire proposed system, and that the residents of Wheatley Hills were overlooking the fact that New York City had effective constructed the traffic right to the area, with construction of the Union Turnpike and the Grand Central Parkway, which lead to Wheatley Hills. Kennedy stated only the city line cuts off the parkways from the same high ridges that would be involved. Kennedy went on to say that the Wheatley Hills opposes based on the idea that they would be opened to the state for automobile traffic.

Kennedy stated that the residents of eastern Nassau County and Suffolk County had been more towards construction of the parkway on the designed route than the western Nassau County community. Kennedy stated that the cost of the project would be between $5 million and $6 million for the system and would protect the landscape through the area, while making sure all grade crossings were eliminated.

In early April 1929, the newly elected governor, Franklin Delano Roosevelt, supported the LISPC in the fight to handle the Wheatley Hills residents, who were represented now by attorney Grenville Clark. Clark stated that only 53.5% of the right-of-way for the Northern State had been acquired and not the 60% originally reported by the LISPC. Some local propaganda insisted that 80% right-of-way had been acquired, but this was deemed erroneous. Clark stated that there had been misleading statements about the residents of Wheatley Hills and their attitudes on the project. Roosevelt called the statements made on April 9 by Clark as "misleading propaganda" and that the differing numbers is so small that Clark could not make an argument about it. Roosevelt stated he had experience in acquiring rights-of-way, calling it a difficult procedure and that it was extraordinary that so much land was acquired for the project despite the heavy opposition.

Roosevelt also called the accusations of the LISPC issuing misleading propaganda as "absurd" and that this always happens when it comes to right-of-way acquisition. The Governor also stated that it would be "simply absurd" to make believe that acres of land with high values would be taken without knowledge of who did what. Roosevelt finally stated that the opposition outside of Wheatley Hills had evaporated so much that local communities were even forwarding their own money to help buy land for the parkway.

Solutions 
In May 1929, the opposition remaining in Nassau County (Wheatley Hills) released a statement that the Nassau County Citizens Committee (NCCC) had been organized to cooperate with the town of Oyster Bay, Nassau County and state authorities for the development of the county. The committee would also oppose any projects which would damage a section of the county. The new committee declared they would fight the Northern State Parkway alignment on the argument that "it is uneconomic, unnecessarily destructive and contrary to the public interest." The committee also stated that the LISPC had given propaganda that had drastically overstated the amount of land acquired, and it was actually only under 20% in Nassau County. The disputed documents also stated that the majority of landowners in Nassau County actually support the project, which they claimed was untrue. On June 9, the committee hired C. F. Stewart as its executive secretary. Stewart, an attorney and civic worker from Woodmere to help fight the project and help design other civic activities.

Behind the scenes, Clark had discovered that Moses had made a deal with Otto Hermann Kahn to realign the Northern State around his private golf course. Clark forwarded his discovery to Hutchinson and Hewitt, who in turn, demanded the payment sources for all purchases of private property. They also requested the information if any alignment was to cross through the route of a donor and was it changed after the gift. Moses denied the accusations made by Hewitt and Hutchinson, but soon admitted to Roosevelt that he had accepted $10,000 (1929 USD) to shift the route but said the shift was to satisfy the objections of local landowners who refused to accept the alignment in Dix Hills. Roosevelt originally wanted to support the alignment through Wheatley Hills, but once Clark threatened to expose the disclosure to the public, he relented. On October 23, 1929, Clark told Roosevelt that the citizens were sick of Moses, who they claimed "refused to compromise" and was "highly insulting". Roosevelt wasted no time coming up with a compromise to make the route have an abrupt turn at Glen Cove Road in Wheatley Hills.

In November 1929, the NCCC met at the Harvard Club and adopted unanimous resolutions to criticize Robert Moses for "unfounded assertions" that he misrepresented the attitude of the NCCC. The board also approved a plan sent in July to convert the Long Island Motor Parkway into a state parkway. The NCCC officially preferred using the Motor parkway over the Northern State Parkway alignment. Rather than get the project involved in further politics, the NCCC preferred getting a solution based on expert opinion.

Robert Moses sent a letter to Ernest Buckland about why the LISPC had done so much for the southern shores of Long Island and not enough for the northern side. Moses accused the residents of Wheatley Hills and now West Hills of blocking a new parkway through the northern shore. The letter however made no reference to accusations made the either day by the NCCC and it was questioned if Moses had heard about it. Moses stated that there had never been more opposition to one project since 1924. Moses denounced the NCCC and its views to prevent and/or postpone all state development in northern Nassau County. Moses backed his right-of-way that the Motor Parkway would have no value for state parkway design, being too narrow and poorly constructed through the center of Nassau County. Moses decried the idea as a "ridiculous suggestion" and push all of the traffic into the center of the island.

Moses argued that traffic congestion in northern Nassau County required desperate measures to get a parkway through the system along with other roads being widened. Moses decried that the traffic would not go through the southern or central parts of the county, but would use locals roads through Nassau County, including North Hempstead Turnpike, which was the only west–east artery. Compared to the southern half of the county, where four arteries were being widened or constructed, the LISPC is not to blame for these problems, but the estate owners in Wheatley Hills and the local politicians representing them over the general public.

In December 1929, Moses, along with Clark, were present at the office of Alfred Smith at the Empire State Building in Manahattan in which an agreement was formed to solve the property questions for the residents of Wheatley Hills. Smith, August Heckscher and Henry Winthrop acted as counselors in settling the dispute. The settlement that was determined is the Northern State Parkway alignment would be moved south to quiet the residents of Wheatley Hills. The LISPC would give $175,000 to acquisition, along with $25,000 from Heckscher and $700,000 from Nassau County. It was also announced that Governor Roosevelt had approved the change and that the rest of the alignment through Long Island would remain the same as the original 1925 proposal. This agreement ended the four-year fight with the residents of Wheatley Hills, West Hills and Old Westbury that had objected to the original alignment.

While the compromise was a success for the residents of Wheatley Hills, according to Robert Caro in The Power Broker, the $175,000 was a smokescreen for the fact that the land purchasing would cost $2.25 million (1929 USD) and rather than the locals, the taxpayers would be stuck with the majority (over 90%) of the bill from the acquisition. The $175,000 also was claimed by Moses to have been spending for the entire cost of the detour, rather than the land acquisition. Caro goes on to explain that the accommodations made for the citizens of Wheatley Hills denied Long Islanders some of the parks on the North Shore that had been proposed by Moses, pardoning Caumsett State Park. Caro also explained that along with the $10,000 bribe that Moses had accepted, the illegal purchases of the Taylor Estate would turn him into a beating stick for the politicians of New York to get him to stop fighting.

Funding and construction

First segment 
In March 1931, over a year removed from the Wheatley Hills debacle, Moses announced the beginning of construction of the Northern State Parkway in Nassau County. The groundbreaking ceremony for the first section of the Northern State was held on March 9, with Moses at the controls of a steam shovel on the estate owned by Nicholas Brady in North Hills. Construction a small segment from the New York City line, where it would eventually meet the Grand Central Parkway, and east to Searington Road and Mineola Boulevard. Five bridges would be constructed in the original contract: Willis Avenue in Mineola, Searington Road in North Hills, Shelter Rock Road and the Long Island Motor Parkway in Lakeville, and Middle Neck Road in Lake Success. The first project would cost about $350,000 (1931 USD).

On June 6, New York City voted to approve the beginning of construction of the Grand Central Parkway, which would connect from the Interborough Parkway to the Northern State at Lake Success. Construction of the project would begin in 1932 with paving and landscaping. Governor Roosevelt announced on July 22 that he would come to the site where the Northern State and the Grand Central would eventually meet and lay a new cornerstone to mark the spot on July 26. The governor, who was touring throughout Nassau and Suffolk County, called the project a significant upgrade to provide the city with proper traffic outlets. Roosevelt laid mortar on the previously placed cornerstone, while Robert Moses announced that state aid would be requested. The day prior, the contract for grading of the new parkway from the city line to Lakeville Road along with construction of the Long Island Motor Parkway and Lakeville Road bridges was awarded. As Moses had warned, the LISPC requested over $5.5 million in funds for the projects to be completed in 1932. All the land for it had been accepted to the commission, and a majority of the money went to paying for the Northern State Parkway.

In January 1932, the budget submitted by Roosevelt would start moving money towards fast tracking construction of parkways on Long Island, as the Westchester parkway system was in full force. $1.08 million was appropriated for the Northern State Parkway construction along with $92,000 for landscaping work out of the $9.5 million requested for Long Island in total. However, in February, the state legislature cut down the amount of money on the budget that Roosevelt had submitted. Instead of the $1.08 million, which was cut from the budget, $200,000 was instead given to the Grand Central Parkway. Roosevelt slammed the decision by the Republican leaders in the Legislature as a "cleverly disguised salary reduction program." The cuts also included $15,000,000 for parkways and highways, which would break an agreement in 1929 that would go to the construction of facilities for motorists. In response, Moses and the LISPC went and applied for federal grants on July 18 to pay for the Northern State, along with other projects slashed in the budget. $1 million was requested to pave both the Grand Central and Northern State.

Two weeks after Moses requested the money, it was approved by the Federal government to get $1.5 million (1932 USD) to pave the Grand Central and Northern State, the latter of which had been constructed from the Queens line to Willis Avenue. It was also stated that Moses hoped the construction projects would be finished by January 1, 1933, rather than the 1932 completion date for the Northern State originally proposed.

On July 8, 1933, the state of New York announced that the Grand Central Parkway from Queens Boulevard in Kew Gardens to the city line and the Northern State Parkway up to Willis Avenue in Mineola would be opened to traffic on July 15. The LISPC stated that the new roadway would be able to handle three and half times the amount of traffic that local roads could handle and would find it much easier to get to the North Shore. The new governor of New York, Herbert Lehman would open the new project and it cost the LISPC $6 million, including $3 million on land acquisition for the Grand Central.

Governor Lehman opened the alignments at the entrance to the Grand Central Parkway in Kew Gardens. When completed with the speech, Lehman removed the flagpole that had blocked entrance to the roadway in front of 2,000 people, including 500 guests from the LISPC. Flags were raised and the Star-Spangled Banner was played by a band. Lehman noted that this is the end of isolation for Long Island, but concerned if the city could afford maintenance as control of the Grand Central would be turned over from the LISPC to the city. The governor and state officials moved out to Mineola after the ceremony, where Lehman headed off for Albany, the rest went for a dinner. However, the first segment of the Northern State was opened, nine years after first proposed.

Extension to Wantagh State Parkway 
Promptly after completion of the Northern State from the Grand Central Parkway to Willis Avenue in Mineola, Moses announced to the media in October 1933 contracts for an extension. This new extension would bring the Northern State from Willis Avenue out to the Jericho Turnpike (NY 25) east of downtown Old Westbury. The new alignment was constructed rapidly, with the project being finished in August 1934. The new  extension of the parkway cost $748,000 (1934 USD) and expected to relieve congestion along the Jericho Turnpike. Brand new interchanges were built at Roslyn Road in Albertson, I.U. Willets Road and Guinea Woods/Glen Cove Road in Carle Place and Old Westbury, while new stone faced bridges were constructed over the Oyster Bay Long Island Rail Road station, Roslyn Road, Albertson Station Road, Hillside Avenue Extension and the Jericho Turnpike.

The ceremony to open the new extension would be held on August 29, 1934, with a ceremony led by Moses, who would cut a ribbon crossed at the Roslyn Road interchange. Moses would speak, along with J. Russell Sprague, the Nassau County supervisor and Arthur Brandt, the State Highway Commissioner and preceded by a meeting of the State Council of Parks at the Queens line. The ceremony would be held at 2:30 pm with less of a fanfare than the previous opening of the first segment. 500 people were present at the ceremony, including representatives from the State Council of Parks, the LISPC, along with Nassau County and New York City officials. Brandt's wife held the scissors that cut the ribbon blocking entrance to the new roadway. The announcement was mentioned that the right-of-way for an extension out to Commack. After the ceremony, officials went to dinner and then inspected work on the Meadowbrook Causeway, which was in construction at the time.

In August 1936, Moses and the LISPC announced the extension of the Northern State Parkway, along with a new north–south parkway to connect the two west–east parkways on Long Island. Moses stated, with money being requested that would cost $2 million (1936 USD) that Moses would request next year. In January 1937, the money was requested by the LISPC at the Nassau County Board of Supervisors. The county would supervise the acquisition of land for the new roadways, but the state of New York would handle paying for construction and maintenance of the new road. It was expected in request that contracts for the new road could be announced in April.

In February 1937, the LISPC announced the design of the extension of the Northern State Parkway along with an extension of the Wantagh State Parkway. This new  set of roadway, designated the "Northern–Wantagh State Parkway Extension", would extend the Wantagh from the Southern State to the Northern State and the Northern State to the interchange with the Wantagh in Wheatley Hills. The plans for the new road would be opened by 1939 so drivers would have easier access to Jones Beach State Park from the 1939 World's Fair at Flushing, Queens. The new roadways would have eighteen stone faced bridges combined between sections, with construction beginning in 1937. The new project would start being landscaped and paved by 1938. On April 7, the LISPC announced that bids on the new extensions would open on April 20 for the new project with the expectation that all at-grade structures would be completed by the end of the year.

On November 20, 1938, the LISPC announced at their headquarters in Babylon that the extension of the Northern State would open to traffic a month later. Although originally at the cost of $2 million in 1936–7, by the time the road would be completed, the cost would come at $4.4 million (1938 USD). However, the new roadway was three months ahead of its slated 1939 completion date. The new roadway would be opened on December 17, with attendance by Governor Lehman, Sprague, Brandt and Moses. It was also announced that the differences in the Northern State alignment also included use of asphalt over concrete and had a  median. The new parkway extension would connect Carle Place, Old Westbury, Westbury, Hicksville, Farmingdale, and Hempstead to the city via the parkway system. Six new interchanges were also constructed, including more of the Glen Cove Road interchange.

The ceremony was held on December 17, with attendance of Moses and company, along with Alfred Smith. 300 cars were lined up on the asphalt, which was designed to make night driving much easier over the concrete. A tour of the new parkway extensions was held, but not over the entire thing. The group went from Westbury along the new alignment of the Northern State, and south on the Wantagh to the Southern State. New lights were installed on the median of the parkways to help with lighting of the parkway. Before a luncheon for the officials, over 600 people were presented the new parkways. The new parkway opened to traffic, connecting drivers to various places along Long Island and New York City.

Extensions to the Sagtikos State Parkway 
With the Northern State Parkway now constructed up to Union Avenue in Westbury, the plans of the LISPC shifted towards extending the highway into Suffolk County. In late July 1940, the State Council of Parks approved $30 million out of $60 million for grade crossing eliminations, which included getting the Northern State from Union Avenue to the "Huntington–Amityville Highway" (current-day NY 110). However, by January 1941, the money had not yet been approved by the Legislature, which caused controversy over whether the money should be allotted. In late 1940, an amendment to the New York State Constitution had been passed so that the money could be shifted for use in parkway construction. Party lines had not formed yet in terms of opposing it, although Moses was appealing to the Republicans in the Legislature to get the money passed, which included $5.5 million to the Northern State extension.

In April 1941, Governor Lehman passed the bill that would transfer the $30 million from the unspent grade crossing funds to the construction of parkways through Long Island and Westchester. The money was set aside for construction of the Northern State extension, which was advertised to benefit traffic on the North Hempstead Turnpike (NY 25A) and the Jericho Turnpike, as well as bring several central Long Island municipalities into the parkway system. The new,  extension would end at NY 110, less than a mile from the birthplace of poet Walt Whitman.

While funds were ready for the new extension in 1941, construction of the new extension did not begin until after World War II, with extra money coming to the project in 1946 courtesy of the Post-War Reconstruction Fund. $22,067,590 (1946 USD) was approved for use by the LISPC, with over $19 million going to state parkway construction on the island. Some of the money was sent to construct the Captree State Parkway, while $4.175 million was sent to construct the extension of the Northern State Parkway out to NY 110 along with extra money for some dividers on the parkway. By the time money was announced, construction had begun on the Northern State. By April 1946, it was announced that another  extension from NY 110 to Deer Park Avenue (CR 35) had been approved, bumping the total project up to $6.225 million.

In November 1947, the New York State Department of Public Works announced that bids were closed on paving the  section of the Northern State from Union Avenue to Plainview Road. The MacAsphalt Company won the job, posting a low bid of $1,066,954 (1947 USD). By that point, thirteen bridges on the new Northern State alignment had been approaching completion and grading had finished. In December 1948, construction was announced on the piece of the Northern State between Plainview Road and Deer Park Avenue, with a proposed extension through Commack to the Sagtikos State Parkway and a spur road to Sunken Meadow State Park. The new contract was announced at a total of $1,372,538 (1948 USD) with a slated completion date of December 31, 1949.

In April 1949, it was announced that the first piece of the Northern State Parkway extension would open to commuter traffic on April 11, 1949. The section started in 1947, extending the road from Union Avenue to Plainview Road in the Woodbury area. However, unlike the previous extensions, this one would not have a public ceremony. Moses, however, mentioned in a public statement that the entire alignment would be open in the spring of 1950. The next piece would open without fanfare on December 19, 1949, with the new extension from Plainview Road to NY 110 at the cost of $3 million (1949 USD). At that point, Moses announced the next piece of the parkway would open within 90 days of the current segment. On May 22, 1950, the section between NY 110 and Deer Park Avenue opened to traffic, longer than the 90-day promise by Moses. Moses called this segment of parkway "a far cry" from the original piece of parkway on Long Island, the Southern State's first section, which opened on November 6, 1927. It was also announced that contracts would begin soon on the parkway between Deer Park Avenue and the Sagtikos State Parkway.

On March 28, 1950, the state of New York made appropriations to begin construction on the Sagtikos State Parkway, which would mark the eastern end of the Northern State Parkway in Commack, with the spur to Sunken Meadow State Park. At the same time, money was funded to upgrade the curbing in the median for both the Northern State and Southern State at the cost of $1.75 million (1950 USD).  On October 4, 1950, the state awarded a contract to Hendrickson Brothers, Inc of Valley Stream to construct the Northern State extension from Deer Park Avenue to the point east of Commack Road that would mark the Sagtikos junction at the cost $1,343,707. Bids on the Sagtikos State Parkway paving were held on June 6, 1951, with the Hudson Contracting Corporation in Kew Gardens bidding $1,407,037 (1951 USD). The new parkway landscaping contract for both parkways was bid on July 12, 1951, along with paving the newly constructed section of the Northern State.

On September 29, 1952, the extension of the Northern State Parkway from Deer Park to Commack was completed and opened alongside the new Sagtikos State Parkway. Like recent extensions from Westbury, there was no ceremony or fanfare held for the opening of the new roads.

Changes during the 1950s and 1960s 
Reconstruction began in 1950 on improving the right-of-way for the Northern State Parkway. These upgrades included a new divider in the center median of the roadway, which was installed in 1951, along with improvement of service roads in the area. The LISPC also started overlaying the original concrete surface constructed with asphalt. New shoulders would be created for disabled vehicles, which would reduce accidents. The Northern State by that point had nearly 60,000 cars using it on average daily basis and nearly 3,500 per hour at its peak. Finally, the route would also be 100% re-landscaped with new trees.

Although proposed in 1939 during opening of the Bethpage State Parkway, construction began in December 1953 on an extension of the Meadowbrook State Parkway north from the Southern State Parkway to the Northern State Parkway. This new parkway would become a traffic reliever for north–south roads through Nassau County, including a new interchange in Old Westbury that would mark the northern terminus of the Meadowbrook. The $10 million (1956 USD) project was completed in 1956, with the parkway being opened to traffic on October 13, 1956, with a ceremony attended by the new governor, W. Averell Harriman, along with Moses and Edward Larkin, the supervisor for the town of Hempstead. All three spoke on behalf of their entities, and after, traveled the new alignment north to the Northern State and back south. The group then went to Roosevelt Field and was praised by William Zeckendorf in honor of completion of the extension.

Construction had already begun in the early 1950s on the Sunken Meadow State Parkway, another spur of the Northern State Parkway to Sunken Meadow State Park. Originally, this was one of the last three pieces of the Long Island parkway system originally proposed, with the Captree and the Heckscher State Parkways being constructed or proposed at the same time. On November 28, 1954, the first section of the new parkway was opened to traffic, opening the part from the Northern and Sagtikos State Parkways to NY 25. Construction also had begun on the extension to the park. On April 1, 1957, the new extension opened to traffic, pardoning the landscaping on the alignment north of NY 25. The $11 million (1957 USD) project was opened formally by Governor Harriman on June 21, 1957, after landscaping had been finished.

On April 11, 1962, the New York State Department of Public Works announced $410,679,000 (1962 USD) in money, a record at the time, to help fund projects throughout New York State, with $83.646 million going to the projects in Westchester, Nassau and Suffolk counties. Among the money is a project to create a spur to extend the Northern State Parkway from its terminus at the Sagtikos and Sunken Meadow State parkways to Veterans Highway (CR 76; future-NY 454). In January 1965, Assemblyman Perry Duryea announced that new governor of New York Nelson Rockefeller set aside money in his state budget to fund LISPC programs. One of the projects included was the $12 million (1965 USD) extension.

On June 9, 1965, the brand new extension of the Northern State would be opened to traffic, moving the eastern terminus to just north of the then-new Suffolk County headquarters and police headquarters. The project cost $4 million and removed the automatic turns to the Sunken Meadow and Sagtikos. Also the LISPC announced the widening at the western end would start later in the year. On November 28, 1965, the LISPC announced widening of the congested sections of both the Grand Central and Northern State between the I-295 (the Clearview Expressway) and Old Westbury. While federal funding helped paid the Grand Central portion of the $20 million project, the $11.5 million for the Northern State came out of the New York State budget. The project would not cost any homes to be taken down, but would cost a lot of trees to be taken down along the roadway. The project would also reconstruct the interchange of the Clearview, Grand Central and Hillside Avenue for a future extension of the Clearview to the Nassau Expressway. Robert Moses announced that the project would begin in Spring 1966.

Construction of the widening however, did not being until 1967, with a cost that had ballooned to $16.7 million (1969 USD), expanding the new parkway from four lanes to six to Glen Cove Road. The LISPC also announced on January 2, 1969, that the project would be completed during the middle of 1969.

Aborted extensions and interchanges

Spur to Caumsett State Park 

On May 20, 1961, the LISPC announced a new parkway would be constructed from the Northern State Parkway to Caumsett State Park on the North Shore of Long Island. This new parkway would be an extension of an extended Bethpage State Parkway, which would be brought from a traffic circle in Plainview to the Northern State, replacing a local two-lane road which connected drivers to the park. In 1965, the LISPC announced that the new roadway would be a four-lane access road (two lanes in each direction) that would be scenic and "well-landscaped". The parkway would also cross through Cold Spring Harbor and directly through the southern end of the village of Lloyd Harbor,  at the cost of taking multiple homes in the area and a Standard Oil Company tank farm.

In order to construct the new extension to the Caumsett, the Bethpage State Parkway would need to be extended from its terminus in Plainview northward. The first new exit, would become a new interchange with the Seaford–Oyster Bay Expressway, eliminating the traffic circle; a diamond interchange with Plainview Avenue and Bethpage State Park; a cloverleaf interchange with Old Country Road; a partial cloverleaf interchange with the Long Island Expressway (NY 495) along with a cloverleaf interchange with the Northern State Parkway. North of the Northern State, access points would be created at the junction with Jericho Turnpike (NY 25), and at the junction of NY 25A and NY 108 in Cold Spring Harbor. North of the NY 25A/NY 108 junction, the parkway would extend into Caumsett State Park and end at a traffic circle.

The extension of the Bethpage was never constructed, however, the proposal for an extension of the Bethpage to the Northern State Parkway was revived in 1990. The Long Island Regional Planning Board proposed in February 1990 that the Bethpage be extended along with two other highways on Long Island, the Wantagh and the Seaford–Oyster Bay Expressway. The Bethpage would be extended northward to construct the connection to the Long Island Expressway and the Northern State Parkway, which would serve as a direct link between northeastern Nassau County and northwestern Suffolk County. The interchange with the Wantagh State Parkway would also be changed as the Board recommended that the parkway be extended northward to the Long Island Expressway from the Northern State, which serves as the northern end of the roadway. These projects were among the 30 new ideas proposed to expand Nassau County road capacity over the next 20 years, with $640 million (1990 USD).

Eastern extension proposals 
With the eastern terminus of the Northern State currently at NY 347 and NY 454, proposals had existed in 1963 to extend the highway to the Wyandanch Preserve. This new extension would extend the Northern State eastward through Smithtown to reach Caleb Smith State Park and interchange with NY 25 near CR 108 (Old Willets Path). A new interchange would be constructed with the Veterans Memorial Highway, soon reaching NY 111 in Village of the Branch. The extension would turn southward near the NY 111 interchange, which would be located near Mount Pleasant Road. The new interchange would cross NY 347 (Neconset–Port Jefferson Highway) again.

The new extension would continue south, crossing over the CR 67 (the Long Island Motor Parkway) and entering a second interchange with the Long Island Expressway again in the vicinity of exit 57 and exit 58. The roadway would continue south, crossing NY 454 for the second time, passing a new entrance to Connetquot State Park further south. The road would continue south, reaching a new interchange with the Heckscher State Parkway, which would be located east of exit 43A.

The Regional Plan Association and Suffolk County truncated these plans in the middle of the 1960s. This new proposal would eliminate the southern turn to the Heckscher, and instead, the county proposed that a new interchange would be constructed with NY 25 in the Village of the Branch, east of NY 111. However, the Regional Plan Association proposed that instead of NY 25, the new parkway would go  further, terminating at the junction of NY 25 and NY 112 in Coram. However, during the 1970s, the New York State Department of Transportation did a study for the extension, but this was deemed unfeasible due to expansion of development in Suffolk County and the raised cost of acquiring land for rights-of-way.

Exit 31A reconstruction concerns 
The interchange constructed between the Meadowbrook and Northern state parkways in 1956 was undergoing a new $61 million (1989 USD) reconstruction project in the late 1980s. Although it was previously redesigned in 1968, it was still the site of about 180 accidents per year—over six times the statewide average for accident frequency. The junction was to be rebuilt with three lanes in each direction for the Northern State in the middle of exit 31A, a direct ramp between the westbound Northern State Parkway and the southbound Meadowbrook, connections from Glen Cove Road to both parkways, and the relocation of exit and entrance ramps within the interchange. Construction began in May 1988, and the project was expected to be completed on October 31, 1991. It was proceeding on schedule until the village of Westbury filed a suit against NYSDOT in February 1989. The lawsuit claimed that NYSDOT did not follow proper environmental guidelines while designing the project because their environmental impact report failed to consider the impacts of a nearby future widening project on the Northern State Parkway. This widening project, considered a second phase of the interchange reconstruction, had no intended date of construction.

The Appellate Division of the New York State Supreme Court ruled that NYSDOT had to provide a new environmental report by May 12, 1989 or face having the reconstruction shut down. The order by the court reversed a decision by the New York State Supreme Court that determined that a revised report was unnecessary. Residents of Westbury claimed that the project would bring noise concerns to the village, along with a spillover of diverted traffic to local roads. Concerns were also stated by then-mayor Ernest Strada about Westbury's water supply and potential impacts from the project. NYSDOT claimed that no disruption would be caused by the project, but Strada insisted there were still concerns. Strada also stated that the village had no interest in shutting down the project; rather, they wanted to ensure that their community would be protected from any disruptions caused by the reconstruction. On April 24, NYSDOT announced they had appealed the stoppage of work on the interchange, which had been suspended pending a ruling by the Court of Appeals, the highest court in the state.

On December 19, 1989, the Court of Appeals announced their decision on the case of Village of Westbury v. Department of Transportation of the State of New York, et al., ruling in favor of Westbury. In its decision, the court stated NYSDOT should have issued a joint report for the interchange and widening projects because both projects improved the flow of traffic on the Northern State Parkway and thus were related. The ruling made by the previous court was affirmed, and NYSDOT was advised to consider the environmental impacts of projects on other nearby projects in the future. While the village of Westbury was praising Ernest Strada for taking on the state, residents of the village of Carle Place felt they were being taken hostage by his actions and that the stoppage of work was hurting their community more than Westbury. Editorials in Newsday also called the mayor "parochial and overzealous".

While Carle Place was complaining about the inability to access their section of town, a January 1990 article in The New York Times mentioned that the Court's decision put Westbury alone against the state, then-Governor Mario Cuomo and regional planners, who were worried about the safety of the roughly 140,000 drivers who used the interchange daily. Local business leaders claimed that Westbury was being selfish in opposing inconvenient construction. Even after the ruling, Strada continued to claim that they wanted to be informed on the impacts of a nearby widening project on the Northern State. NYSDOT officials worried that this would add more bureaucratic levels to getting approval for local road projects and that it could set the project back three years. Officials also went out of their way to call this a simple "not in my backyard" case. NYSDOT continued to claim that the projects were separate, and filed three years apart, despite the court's ruling that they were similar projects. Cuomo, worried about the safety of drivers, invited Strada to come to Albany to meet with NYSDOT Commissioner Franklin White and State Senator Norman J. Levy to make an agreement. Strada, however, felt that in order to compromise, they would have to continue the original "violation" of not giving a report.

Westbury and NYSDOT came to a deal allowing construction to resume in February 1990, with lane changes and other modifications being made by the end of the month. This truce, made by Governor Cuomo, allowed work to resume at a normal pace, with nearly 200 workers doing daily work on the project by April 1990. The speed of progress on the reconstruction put the project back on track to meet the original October 1991 deadline. Mayor Strada, however, stated that he thought NYSDOT would not advance any work that would "need to be ripped up". The interchange reconstruction project was ultimately completed in 1991 as expected.

Service station proposal

While long after designing the Long Island parkway system, Robert Moses constructed three stations along the Northern State Parkway. One was located east of the Meadowbrook State Parkway interchange (exit 31A) in Carle Place, which was closed in 1986. The second was located in Commack, located west of CR 4, opened in the early 1950s and abandoned in 1985. The Commack station, which still stands, was proposed in 1989 by the Huntington town historian Rufus Langhans to save the station, which was in danger of being demolished, suggesting the station be declared a town landmark and possibly be a welcome center for the Northern State. However, at the time, the New York State Department of Transportation, was looking at all angles to what to do with the former gas stations.

Changes since 1992

NY 110 interchange 
The interchange with NY 110 was originally a split cloverleaf exit, signed as exit 40S for southbound 110 and exit 40N for the northbound direction. In 2011, reconstruction of the interchange began. The cloverleaf interchange has been replaced by a single exit 40 with longer acceleration lanes, and traffic lights on 110 to regulate on and off-ramp traffic. The original overpass carrying the parkway over 110 was replaced, reusing much of the old stonework of its predecessor. In addition, a third lane was added in each direction on 110 in order to reduce congestion in the area. The project was completed in late 2013.

Exit list
Exit numbers continue sequentially from those of the Grand Central Parkway.

Notes

References

External links

 Northern Parkway (Greater New York Roads)

Parkways in New York (state)
Robert Moses projects
Roads on Long Island
Unfinished buildings and structures in the United States
Transportation in Nassau County, New York
Transportation in Suffolk County, New York